Lee Baxter (born 17 June 1976) is a Scottish-Swedish football goalkeeper and coach who has played for clubs in Sweden and England and trained goalkeepers in several international clubs.
He moved from Malmö FF to Sheffield United in 2003, to cover a goalkeeping crisis. His only appearance was The Blades Football League match against Burnley on 6 December 2003. He was deemed to be at fault for two of the goals and was subbed at half time for Alan Fettis.

Baxter only played for Sheffield United in England, before moving back to Sweden with IFK Gothenburg.

He is the son of football manager Stuart Baxter, and grandson of footballer Bill Baxter.

Following his playing career, he took on the role of goalkeeper coach at AIK. In 2015, he moved to Turkish Super Lig team, Gençlerbirliği S.K. His time at the club was cut short, following the dismissal of the head coach. Later he worked as the Head Goalkeeper coach at Supersport United, in the South African Premier Soccer League (PSL). He was later goalkeeper coach for Kaizer Chiefs.

References

External links

 

1976 births
Living people
Swedish people of Scottish descent
Sportspeople from Helsingborg
Swedish footballers
English footballers
Association football goalkeepers
J1 League players
Allsvenskan players
Sanfrecce Hiroshima players
Vissel Kobe players
Rangers F.C. players
AIK Fotboll players
Malmö FF players
Sheffield United F.C. players
IFK Göteborg players
Bodens BK players
Landskrona BoIS players
Aarhus Gymnastikforening players
AIK Fotboll non-playing staff
Swedish expatriate footballers
English expatriate footballers
Swedish expatriate sportspeople in Japan
English expatriate sportspeople in Japan
Expatriate footballers in Japan
Swedish expatriate sportspeople in Scotland
Expatriate footballers in Scotland
Swedish expatriate sportspeople in England
Expatriate footballers in England